Samuth Sithnaruepol (born 17 May 1959) is a Thai retired professional boxer. He was the first Thai fighter to win the IBF world championship and  weight class 105 lbs.

Boxing career
After a Muay Thai career that saw him lose more fights than he won, Sithnaruepol turned to professional boxing in early 1982. Managed by Sr. Col. Banju Ongsangkune, he won the 105 lb. OPBF title and defended it four times.

On March 24, 1988, Sithnaruepol fought Filipino contender Pretty Boy Lucas for the vacant IBF mini flyweight title at Rajadamnern Stadium in Bangkok. In the 11th round, a facial injury left Lucas unable to continue, making Sithnaruepol the winner by TKO and Thailand's 11th world boxing champion.

Sithnaruepol defended two times before losing to Indonesian Nico Thomas on June 17, 1989 at Jakarta. Thomas became Indonesia's second world champion, after Ellyas Pical.

Despite being a champion, Sithnaruepol was not as well known as contemporaries like Khaosai Galaxy, Sot Chitalada, or Samart Payakaroon, perhaps because the IBF was a newly formed organization and not well known in Thailand.

After retirement, he entered military service as a Sergeant Major Second Class (SM2) at Department of Army Transportation.

References

External links
 

Living people
1959 births
Mini-flyweight boxers
Samuth Sithnaruepol
Samuth Sithnaruepol
International Boxing Federation champions
Samuth Sithnaruepol